The Río Grande de Zacapa is a river in Guatemala.

References

External links
Map of Guatemala including the river

Rivers of Guatemala
Geography of Mesoamerica